Mari Hamada Live Tour 2016 "Mission" is a live video by Japanese singer/songwriter Mari Hamada, released on February 22, 2017 by Meldac/Tokuma Japan. Recorded live on July 18, 2016 at the Tokyo International Forum Hall A as the final show of Hamada's Mission tour, the video was released on Blu-ray and DVD. To promote the video, Hamada and guitarist Nozomu Wakai hosted a one-night premium screening at the Shinjuku Piccadilly on March 2.

The video peaked at No. 25 on Oricon's Blu-ray Disc chart and at No. 14 on Oricon's DVD chart.

Track listing

 Tracks 20–25 released as "Disc 2" on DVD version.

Personnel 
 Takashi Masuzaki (Dimension) – guitar
 Nozomu Wakai – guitar
 Yōichi Fujii – guitar
 Tomonori "You" Yamada – bass
 Satoshi "Joe" Miyawaki – drums
 Takanobu Masuda – keyboards
 Masafumi Nakao – keyboards, sound effects
 ERI (Eri Hamada) – backing vocals

Charts

References

External links 
  (Mari Hamada)
 Official website (Tokuma Japan)
 

2017 live albums
2017 video albums
Japanese-language live albums
Live video albums
Mari Hamada video albums
Tokuma Shoten albums